The New Zealand Pacing Free For All is a major New Zealand harness race. It is notable as it is a Group One championship sprint race and has been won by nearly every champion pacer in New Zealand.

History of the race

Horses which have won the Free-for-all include hall of famers and champions who later shone in the United States and Canada like Cardigan Bay and Caduceus. The latter who won the Free For All three times. The race has also been won three times by Robalan, Harold Logan, Lordship and Author Dillon. Between 1942 and 1948 the race was renamed the New Zealand Pacing Sprint Championship.

The race is contested at Addington Raceway on the Canterbury Anniversary public holiday and Canterbury A&P Show day on the Friday of "Cup week" in mid-November. With the New Zealand Trotting Cup run on the Tuesday of that week, the Free For All attracts most of the same horses as the Cup, and is often won in the same year by the same horse. There is also the New Zealand Cup for gallopers and a number of other premier races for the harness, thoroughbred and greyhound racing codes that week.

Distance

Unlike the New Zealand Cup it is run from a mobile, rather than standing, start.  From 1914 to 1972 the event was generally over  miles or from 1973 onwards 2000 m, although from 1920 to 1927 it was a mile only. The 1962 race won by Lordship is recorded by HRNZ to have been over  furlongs.  The 2008 race was won in record time (1.54-mile rate for 2000 m) by Auckland Reactor. For 2012 and 2013 the race was contested over 1 mile (1609 m), meaning the race will start on a bend.  It was subsequently changed to 1950 m for 2013 to 2017 and has been over 1980 m for 2018 onwards.

Stake money

The total stake money for the race was:

 $165,600 (2020)
 $200,000 (2010)
 $300,000 (2008)
 $100,000 (2000)   
 $85,000 (1990)
 $18,000 (1980)
 $4,500 (1970)

The total race stake was valued at $300,000 in 2008, but was reduced to $200,000 and below in later years due to economic pressures.

Records

Most wins:
 3 - Arthur Dillon (1918, 1919, 1920)
 3 - Caduceus (1956, 1958, 1959)
 3 - Harold Logan (1931, 1934, 1936)
 3 - Lordship (1962, 1964, 1967)
 3 - Robalan (1972, 1973, 1974)

Most wins by a driver:
 7 - Tony Herlihy (1987, 1991, 1993, 1997, 2006, 2012)
 5 - D D Nyhan (1962, 1964, 1972, 1973, 1974)
 5 - Mark Purdon (1988, 1995, 2003, 2008, 2016)
 4 - M F Holmes (1934, 1952, 1957, 1965)
 4 - Natalie Rasmussen (2017, 2018, 2020, 2021)

Results 

* won the New Zealand Trotting Cup same year

Full details of each year's race are contained on the Harness Racing New Zealand website

See also 

 Harness racing
 Harness racing in New Zealand
 Auckland Trotting Cup
 New Zealand Trotting Cup
 Great Northern Derby
 Rowe Cup
 Dominion Handicap
 Inter Dominion Pacing Championship
 Inter Dominion Trotting Championship
 Miracle Mile Pace
 Noel J Taylor Mile
 New Zealand Messenger

References 

Harness racing in New Zealand
Horse races in New Zealand